New York's 16th State Senate district is one of 63 districts in the New York State Senate. It has  been represented by Democrat Toby Ann Stavisky since 1999, following her victory in a special election to succeed her late husband Leonard Stavisky.

Geography
District 16 covers a narrow stretch of central Queens, including parts of the neighborhoods of Flushing, Forest Hills, Elmhurst, Murray Hill, Bayside, and Woodside.

The district overlaps with New York's 6th and 14th congressional districts, and with the 24th, 25th, 26th, 27th, 28th, 30th, 34th, 35th, 39th, and 40th districts of the New York State Assembly.

Recent election results

2020

2018

2016

2014

2012

Federal results in District 16

References

16